Lieutenant-Colonel William Legge, 7th Earl of Dartmouth  (22 February 1881 – 28 February 1958), styled Viscount Lewisham between 1891 and 1936, was a British peer and Conservative politician, who was Acting Lord Great Chamberlain 1928–36.

Background
Legge was the eldest son of the 6th Earl of Dartmouth. He was educated at Eton and Christ Church, Oxford. He commissioned as a Second lieutenant in the Staffordshire Yeomanry (Queen's Own Royal Regiment) on 11 June 1902.

Political and military career
In 1907, he joined the London County Council and entered Parliament in 1910 as Member of Parliament for West Bromwich, a seat he held until 1918. While a lieutenant in the Staffordshire Yeomanry, he was appointed honorary colonel of the 7th Battalion, Duke of Wellington's Regiment, on 27 April 1910. On 23 April 1912, he was promoted to captain in the Staffordshire Yeomanry, and  received a temporary promotion to major on 1 November 1914. He served with the Staffordshire Yeomanry in the Sinai and Palestine Campaign in the First World War, for which he was awarded the Territorial Decoration, and made an officer of the Order of the Nile. On 13 December 1917, he was promoted acting lieutenant-colonel while commanding a Yeomanry regiment. He ceased command on 24 June 1918 and reverted to the rank of major. On 22 November 1922, he resigned his honorary colonelcy. Lewisham was appointed a deputy lieutenant of Staffordshire on 18 November 1920. He was High Bailiff of Westminster from 1930 to 1942 and was made a GCVO for his services on 1 January 1934. Legge inherited his father's titles in 1936.

Family
Viscount Lewisham, as he was then styled, married Lady Ruperta Wynn-Carington, third daughter of Charles Wynn-Carington, 1st Marquess of Lincolnshire, on 7 December 1905. They had six children:

Lady Mary Cecilia Legge (1906–2003), married Noel Findlay.
Lady Elizabeth Legge (1908–2000), married Ronald Lambert Basset.
Lady Diana Legge (1910–1970), married (1) Hon. John Hamilton-Russell, son of 9th Viscount Boyne (killed 1943); (2) Adrian Matthews.
William Legge, Viscount Lewisham (1913–1942), killed at the Second Battle of El Alamein.
Lady Barbara Legge (1916–2013), married Adam Kwiatkowski.
Lady Josceline Gabrielle Legge (1918–1995), married Hon. Dermot Chichester, who would later accede to the titles Baron Templemore and Marquess of Donegall.

Following the death of his father-in-law in 1928, Lord Dartmouth acted as Deputy Lord Great Chamberlain until the death of George V in 1936. Lord Dartmouth died in February 1958, aged 77. As he had no surviving male issue, he was succeeded by his younger brother, Humphry Legge.

References

External links 
 

1881 births
1958 deaths
People educated at Eton College
Alumni of Christ Church, Oxford
7
Knights Grand Cross of the Royal Victorian Order
Legge, William
Legge, William
Legge, William
UK MPs who inherited peerages
British Army personnel of World War I
Staffordshire Yeomanry officers
William
Presidents of the Marylebone Cricket Club
Deputy Lieutenants of Staffordshire